Kōloa is an unincorporated community and census-designated place (CDP) in Kauai County, Hawaii, United States. The population was 2,231 at the 2020 census, up from 1,942 at the 2000 census. The first successful sugarcane plantation in the Hawaiian Islands was started here in 1835. It became a part of Grove Farm in 1948.

The name Kōloa is often incorrectly translated as "native duck", which is the correct translation for the similar-looking koloa (without the macron). Kōloa means "a long cane with a crook." According to one account, the district of Kōloa was named for a steep rock called Pali-o-kō-loa which was found in Waikomo Stream.

Geography
Kōloa is located on the southern side of the island of Kauai at  (21.907137, -159.465877).  It is bordered to the northwest by Omao and to the south by Poipu.

Waikomo Stream passes through the center of the community.

Demographics

As of the census of 2000, there were 1,942 people, 693 households, and 507 families residing in the CDP. The racial makeup of the CDP was 20.2% White, 0.4% African American, 0.3% Native American, 43.8% Asian, 7.8% Pacific Islander, 1.2% from other races, and 26.4% from two or more races. Hispanic or Latino of any race were 11.4% of the population.

There were 693 households, out of which 34.8% had children under the age of 18 living with them, 47.2% were married couples living together, 18.9% had a female householder with no husband present, and 26.8% were non-families. 22.5% of all households were made up of individuals, and 8.7% had someone living alone who was 65 years of age or older.  The average household size was 2.80 and the average family size was 3.25.

In the CDP the population was spread out, with 26.0% under the age of 18, 9.9% from 18 to 24, 26.7% from 25 to 44, 21.6% from 45 to 64, and 15.8% who were 65 years of age or older.  The median age was 36 years. For every 100 females, there were 101.0 males.  For every 100 females age 18 and over, there were 96.3 males.

The median income for a household in the CDP was $34,786, and the median income for a family was $43,393. Males had a median income of $31,125 versus $25,938 for females. The per capita income for the CDP was $16,224.  About 16.7% of families and 17.8% of the population were below the poverty line, including 26.5% of those under age 18 and 6.0% of those age 65 or over.

History
The Old Sugar Mill of Koloa was the first major sugarcane plantation in Hawaii in 1835. Missionary Daniel Dole and his family opened a boarding school for English-speaking children, sometimes called the Koloa Academy, in 1855.

Places of interest
 Old Sugar Mill – A National Historic Landmark. Founded in 1835, the Koloa sugar plantation and mill was the first successful large-scale sugar operation in the Hawaiian Islands.
 Poipu Bay Golf Course – Home of the PGA Grand Slam of Golf from 1994 to 2006
Saint Raphael Catholic Church - The oldest Catholic church in Kauai
Spouting Horn
Hoʻai heiau
Kaneiolouma Heiau
Makauwahi Cave

Notable natives
 Raymond Kāne, slack-key guitarist  
 Prince Jonah Kuhio Kalanianaʻole Piʻikoi, born at Hoʻai, Kualu in Koloa; Kuhio was an heir to the throne of Hawaiʻi, served as minister of the interior for the Kingdom of Hawaiʻi and later became the Republican delegate to the U.S. Congress in 1903.

References

Further reading
Alexander, Arthur (1937). Koloa Plantation 1835 - 1935. Honolulu, HI: Star-Bulletin.
Hawaiian Sugar Planters' Association (1949). Sugar in Hawaii. Honolulu, HI: Hawaiian Sugar Planters' Association.

Census-designated places in Kauai County, Hawaii
Populated places on Kauai
Populated places established in 1835
1835 establishments in Hawaii
Populated coastal places in Hawaii